The  is a kei car with sliding doors manufactured by the Japanese carmaker Daihatsu since 2016. Despite adopting the "Move" nameplate, the car shared its underpinnings with the Tanto instead.

Etymology 
The name "Canbus" is a combination of the verb "can", describing the car's ability, and the noun "bus", describing the car's bus-like shape and inspiration from Volkswagen Type 2, which was also known as the "Bus".

Overview 
The Move Canbus borrowed its overall design from the Hinata concept car. The Hinata was first showcased at the 2015 Tokyo Motor Show alongside the Tempo food truck and Noriori wheelchair accessible van concepts.

The Canbus is targeted towards the women sales demographic.

First generation (LA800; 2016) 

The first-generation Move Canbus was sold between 2016 and 2022.

Second generation (LA850; 2022) 

The second-generation Move Canbus was unveiled on 5 July 2022. Built on the Daihatsu New Global Architecture (DNGA) platform, it is divided into "Stripes" and "Theory" sub-models.

References

External links 

 

Move Canbus
Cars introduced in 2016
2020s cars
Microvans
Front-wheel-drive vehicles
All-wheel-drive vehicles
Vehicles with CVT transmission
Retro-style automobiles